The Clachnacudainn Range is a subrange of the Selkirk Mountains in southeastern British Columbia, Canada, located within Mount Revelstoke National Park, just northeast of Revelstoke. It was named by Arthur Wheeler in reference to the Clachnacudainn charter stone, located in Inverness, Scotland. The range is bounded by the Illecillewaet River to the south, Lake Revelstoke to the west, and Carnes and Woolsey Creeks to the north and east.

References

External links 

Clachnacudainn Range in the Canadian Mountain Encyclopedia

Selkirk Mountains